Buckeye is an unincorporated community in Garrard County, Kentucky, United States.  It lies along Route 39 northeast of the city of Lancaster, the county seat of Garrard County.  Its elevation is 955 feet (291 m).

References

Unincorporated communities in Garrard County, Kentucky
Unincorporated communities in Kentucky